2021–21 season of Ghanaian club Accra Great Olympics F.C.

Pre-season and friendlies 
The season was delayed as a result of COVID-19 pandemic.

Squad

Roaster beginning of season

League 

 2020–21 Ghana Premier League

Matches

Squad statistics

Goalscorers 
Includes all competitive matches. The list is sorted alphabetically by surname when total goals are equal.

Clean sheets 
The list is sorted by shirt number when total clean sheets are equal. Numbers in parentheses represent games where both goalkeepers participated and both kept a clean sheet; the number in parentheses is awarded to the goalkeeper who was substituted on, whilst a full clean sheet is awarded to the goalkeeper who was on the field at the start of play.

Awards

Ghana Premier League Player of the Month

Managers 
In December 2020, Annor Walker took a health leave and Yaw Preko and Godwin Attram were brought in a Head coach and assistant respectively. He later resumed in February 2021.

 Annor Walker (head coach) 2020–
 Yaw Preko (assistant head coach) 2020–2021
 Godwin Attram  (assistant head coach) 2020–2021

References 

Accra Great Olympics F.C.
2020–21 Ghana Premier League by team